The UK Singles Chart is one of many music charts compiled by the Official Charts Company that calculates the best-selling singles of the week in the United Kingdom. Before 2004, the chart was only based on the sales of physical singles. This list shows singles that peaked in the Top 10 of the UK Singles Chart during 1982, as well as singles which peaked in 1981 and 1983 but were in the top 10 in 1982. The entry date is when the single appeared in the top 10 for the first time (week ending, as published by the Official Charts Company, which is six days after the chart is announced).

One-hundred and fifty-four singles were in the top ten in 1982. Ten singles from 1981 remained in the top 10 for several weeks at the beginning of the year, while "A Winter's Tale" by David Essex, "Best Years of Our Lives" by Modern Romance and "You Can't Hurry Love" by Phil Collins were both released in 1982 but did not reach their peak until 1983. "Ant Rap" by Adam and the Ants, "I'll Find My Way Home" by Jon and Vangelis, "It Must Be Love" by Madness, "The Land of Make Believe" by Bucks Fizz and "Mirror Mirror (Mon Amour)" by Dollar were the singles from 1981 to reach their peak in 1982. Thirty-three artists scored multiple entries in the top 10 in 1982. Bananarama, Culture Club, Hall & Oates, Iron Maiden and Wham! were among the many artists who achieved their first UK charting top 10 single in 1982.

The 1981 Christmas number-one, "Don't You Want Me" by The Human League remained at number-one for the first two weeks of 1982. The first new number-one single of the year was "The Land of Make Believe" by Bucks Fizz, who won the Eurovision Song Contest for the United Kingdom the previous year. Overall, twenty-two different singles peaked at number-one in 1982, with Bucks Fizz and The Jam (2) having the most singles hit that position.

Background

Multiple entries
One-hundred and fifty-four singles charted in the top 10 in 1982, with one-hundred and forty-six singles reaching their peak this year.

Thirty-three artists scored multiple entries in the top 10 in 1982. The Jam, Madness, Paul McCartney and Shakin' Stevens shared the record for most top 10 hits in 1982 with four hit singles each.

Culture Club were one of a number of artists with two top-ten entries, including the number-one single "Do You Really Want to Hurt Me". Bow Wow Wow, Dollar, Hall & Oates, Kool and the Gang and Stevie Wonder were among the other artists who had multiple top 10 entries in 1982.

Chart debuts
Fifty-eight artists achieved their first top 10 single in 1982, either as a lead or featured artist. Of these, seven went on to record another hit single that year: Bow Wow Wow, Culture Club, Fun Boy Three, Hall & Oates, Japan, The Kids from "Fame" and Yazoo. ABC, Bananarama and Shalamar all had three other entries in their breakthrough year.

The following table (collapsed on desktop site) does not include acts who had previously charted as part of a group and secured their first top 10 solo single. 

Notes
Adrian Gurvitz was a member of the rock trio The Gun who scored a top 10 hit with "Race with the Devil" in November 1968, peaking at number 8. "Classic" is his only solo top ten single to date. Adam and the Ants disbanded in 1982 and lead singer Adam Ant had his first single independent of the band, reaching number one with "Goody Two Shoes".

Midge Ure was in the line-up of various groups, including Thin Lizzy and Visage before his solo career began in 1982. His cover of "No Regrets" charted at number 9.

Songs from films
Original songs from various films entered the top 10 throughout the year. These included "Arthur's Theme (Best That You Can Do)" (Arthur), "Fame" (Fame), "Eye of the Tiger" (Rocky III) and "Why" (Soup for One).

Best-selling singles
Dexys Midnight Runners had the best-selling single of the year with "Come On Eileen". The single spent nine weeks in the top 10 (including four weeks at number one) and sold over 1.2 million copies and was certified platinum by the BPI. "Fame" by Irene Cara came in second place, selling more than 975,000 copies and losing out by around 225,000 sales. Survivor's "Eye of the Tiger", "The Lion Sleeps Tonight" from Tight Fit and "Do You Really Want to Hurt Me" by Culture Club made up the top five. Singles by Musical Youth, Eddy Grant, Goombay Dance Band, Paul McCartney with Stevie Wonder, and The Jam were also in the top ten best-selling singles of the year.

Top-ten singles
Key

Entries by artist

The following table shows artists who achieved two or more top 10 entries in 1982, including singles that reached their peak in 1981 or 1983. The figures include both main artists and featured artists, while appearances on ensemble charity records are also counted for each artist. The total number of weeks an artist spent in the top ten in 1982 is also shown.

See also
1982 in British music
List of number-one singles from the 1980s (UK)

General

Specific

Notes

 "Layla" originally peaked at number seven upon its initial release in 1972.
 "One Step Further" was the United Kingdom's entry at the Eurovision Song Contest in 1982.
 "This Time (We'll Get It Right)" was recorded by the England football team as the official single supporting their 1982 FIFA World Cup campaign.
 "A Little Peace" (German: Ein bißchen Frieden) was Germany's winning entry at the Eurovision Song Contest in 1982.
 "We Have a Dream" was recorded by the Scotland football team as the official single supporting their 1982 FIFA World Cup campaign.
 "Fantasy Island" spent two separate weeks at its peak of number 5, dropping to number 6 on 5 June 1982 before rising a place the following week.
 "Love Me Do" first peaked outside the top ten at number 17 on 2 January 1963. It was reissued in 1982 and reached a new peak of number 4 on 30 October 1982.
 "Theme from Harry's Game" was originally composed as the theme song for the Yorkshire Television series Harry's Game before its release as a single.
 "Our House" re-entered the top 10 at number 10 on 22 January 1983 (week ending).
 Figure includes song that first charted in 1981 but peaked in 1982.
 Figure includes song that peaked in 1981.
 Figure includes song that peaked in 1983.

External links
1982 singles chart archive at the Official Charts Company (click on relevant week)
The Official Top 50 best-selling songs of 1982 at the Official Charts Company

United Kingdom
Top 10 singles
1982